The Remutaka Rail Trail (spelled Rimutaka Rail Trail prior to 2017) is a walking and cycling track in the North Island of New Zealand.  It runs between Maymorn and Cross Creek, and follows  of the original route of the Wairarapa Line over the Remutaka Range between the Mangaroa Valley and the Wairarapa, including the world-famous Rimutaka Incline.  Parts of the trail are also used by vehicles both from the regional council and from forestry companies with tree plantations in the area; members of the public have limited vehicular access from the Kaitoke end to a car park, go-kart track and gun range.  Access is also granted by permission to horse riders.  Touring coaches have been used upon occasion to convey tourists and other visitors to various parts of the route.

The trail is a popular regional recreation facility and is used by more than 30,000 walkers, runners, and cyclists annually.  It is part of a network of walking and cycling trails in public parks and reserves in the area.  Several forestry roads diverge from the rail trail and are also used for recreational purposes.

History 

The Wellington City and Suburban Water Supply Board assumed ownership of the railway corridor land on the Wellington side of the Remutaka Ranges following closure of the railway line in 1955.  They retained the railway bridges so as to maintain vehicular access to the area for forestry purposes.  Trees were planted by forestry staff around the summit yard and along the route from the late 1950s to the early 1970s.  Access was restricted, and it was rare for anyone to be granted permission to enter the area for recreation.

The Incline section became the responsibility of the New Zealand Forest Service.  All railway-related structures were removed from Cross Creek and Summit in the years following closure of the line.  The Cross Creek yard and incline section were gradually reclaimed by nature.  The Siberia embankment collapsed during a severe storm in 1967 after its drainage became blocked.  A similar problem caused the Summit tunnel to flood.

The publication of A Line Of Railway in 1976 and establishment of Featherston’s Fell Engine Museum helped spur interest in the Incline, prompting the Forest Service to provide permanent access to Cross Creek in 1984.  In order to facilitate recreational use of the formation, it drained Summit Tunnel and cleared the Cross Creek yard and incline formation. A proposal mooted in the mid 1980s for a walkway between Cross Creek and Kaitoke culminated in the opening of the Rimutaka Rail Trail on 1 November 1987, a joint project between the Wellington Regional Council and the Department of Conservation. Shelter sheds were constructed at Cross Creek and Summit, and several picnic areas along the route. A retaining wall and culverts were installed near the entrance to Price's Tunnel in 2009 by the Department of Conservation to remedy a slip that occurred the previous year.

Management of the trail 
The Cross Creek to Summit section is managed by the Department of Conservation, Summit to Maymorn by the Greater Wellington Regional Council. After Kaitoke the trail runs through Tunnel Gully Reserve.

If traversing the entire length of the rail trail, a trip can be timed to start at Cross Creek and meet a Wairarapa Connection train at Maymorn station.

Cross Creek – Kaitoke 
This  section can be accessed from either end. At Kaitoke there are signposted directions along Incline Rd off SH 2 to the start of the formation,  km along which is a car park. From the Cross Creek car park it is a  hour walk to the Cross Creek station yard. About six hours should be allowed to traverse the entire distance between Cross Creek and Kaitoke.

The following car parks are available for users of the trail:
 Cross Creek: 
 Kaitoke: 

Points of interest along this section include:
 Cross Creek yard, the site of Cross Creek railway station
 Horseshoe Gully, the site of the Siberia embankment
 Summit yard, the site of Summit railway station
 Rimutaka Tunnel ventilation shaft, built after it was decided to dieselise the line instead of electrifying it as originally planned, and it was found that there was insufficient natural ventilation to operate diesel locomotives through the tunnel
 Munitions Bend bridge, the footbridge here was installed in 2003

Kaitoke – Maymorn 
Though this  section can be walked or cycled from either end, access is easiest from the Maymorn end of the trail.  At the end of Plateau Road is a car park for recreational users of the Tunnel Gully reserve, from which access can be gained to the rail trail.  At the intersection of Maymorn Road and Parkes Line Road, near Maymorn railway station and car park, is an access road which joins with the rail trail on the hillside above the Rimutaka Tunnel portal.  From the Kaitoke end, access to the rail trail can be gained either from one of several forestry roads which join up with the Kaitoke – Cross Creek section of the trail, or from a forestry road that connects with Kaitoke Loop Road about  km west of Station Drive.

The following parking facilities are near the Maymorn end of this section of the trail:
 Plateau Road: 
 Maymorn railway station
There are no car parking facilities at the Kaitoke end.

Points of interest along this section of the route include:
 Mangaroa Tunnel, 152 metres long

Future 

In 2011 the Rimutaka Incline Railway Heritage Trust put forward a proposal to reinstate the railway line over the Remutaka Range. It was withdrawn in February 2012.  The proposal was to incorporate all of the former railway formation that currently comprises the rail trail.

The plan meant laying of new track would occur in the future.  The trust has worked on stage one of their plan, which involves the development of facilities at Maymorn.  Later stages include the development of alternative facilities for current users of the rail trail prior to the laying of track.

Gallery

See also 
 Cross Creek railway station
 Kaitoke railway station
 List of rail trails
 Maymorn railway station
 Rimutaka Incline
 Rimutaka Tunnel
 Summit railway station, New Zealand

References

Footnotes

External links 
 Remutaka Rail Trail.  Greater Wellington Regional Council.
 Tunnel Gully.  Greater Wellington Regional Council.
 Remutaka Rail Trail.  Department of Conservation.

Hiking and tramping tracks in New Zealand
Rail trails in New Zealand
Protected areas of the Wellington Region